Rossmere is a provincial electoral division in the Canadian province of Manitoba. It was created by redistribution in 1968, and has formally existed since the provincial election of 1969. The riding is located in the northeastern section of the City of Winnipeg.

Rossmere is bordered on the southeast by Radisson, to the south by Elmwood and Concordia, to the north & west by Kildonan-River East.

Rossmere's population in 2018 was 21,150.  In 2018, the average family income was $70,969, and the unemployment rate was 6.80%.  According to a 2018 boundary commission, 20.8% of the riding's residents were immigrants; 25% listed German as their ethnic origin, and a further 11% are Ukrainian.  The aboriginal population was 12.7%.

Rossmere is relatively affluent, and most of its residents are in the middle-income range.  There is still a significant working-class presence in the riding, however:  13.8% of the riding's industry is in Health Care & Social Assistance, with a further 10.1% work in the retail trade.

Although Rossmere's first MLA was New Democratic Party premier Edward Schreyer, it was historically a swing seat between the NDP and the Progressive Conservatives. After Schreyer's resignation in 1979, he was succeeded by the NDP's Vic Schroeder, who was re-elected in the elections of 1981 and 1986 over his Conservative opposition. Schroeder was a senior cabinet minister in the government of Howard Pawley, but was defeated in the 1988 election that swept the NDP from office.  Progressive Conservative Harold Neufeld held the seat from 1988 to 1993, while future MP and federal cabinet minister Vic Toews was the MLA from 1995 to 1999.  Both served in the cabinets of Gary Filmon.

For much of the early part of the new millennium, however, the Conservatives were not competitive in the seat. New Democrat Harry Schellenberg, who first won the seat in a 1993 by-election before narrowly losing to Toews in the 1995 provincial election, regained the seat in the 1999 election by narrowly defeating Toews in a rematch.  Schellenberg went on to win re-election in the 2003 provincial election with nearly two-thirds of the vote.  Schellenberg was succeeded by fellow NDP member Erna Braun, who won the seat in 2007 provincial election with 60% of the vote. Notably, the Conservatives did not nominate a candidate until after the election was called. The Tories took back the seat amid the massive Tory wave that swept through the province in 2016, with Andrew Micklefield defeating Braun by a nearly 2-to-1 margin.

Rossmere has voted for the party that has won every general election since its creation, except 1977.

List of provincial representatives
This riding has elected the following MLAs:

Electoral results

1969 general election

1973 general election

1977 general election

1979 by-election

1981 general election

1986 general election

1988 general election

1990 general election

1993 by-election

1995 general election

1999 general election

2003 general election

2007 general election

2011 general election

2016 general election

2019 general election

References

Manitoba provincial electoral districts
Politics of Winnipeg